The 2019 Nationals is the 49th Men's Nationals.  The Nationals was a team handball tournament to determine the National Champion from 2019 from the US.

Venues
The championship was played at venues at the Myrtle Beach Sports Center in Myrtle Beach, South Carolina.

Qualification

West Point Black (Army) which ranked 2nd at the NTHL and at the Wildcard Standings will not attending the competition. due to graduation.

Modus

The eight teams are split in two pools A and B and they play a round roubin.

The last two teams per group were qualified for the 5-8th place semifinals.

The losers from the 5-8th place semis played a 7th place game and the winners the 5th place game.

The best two teams per group were qualified for the semifinals.

The losers from the semis played a small final and the winners the final.

Results

Group stage

Group A

Group B

Championship

Semifinals

Small Final

Final

Consolation

5-8th Place Semifinals

7th Place

5th Place

Final ranking

Statistics

Awards

Top scorers

All-Tournament Team

References

External links
 Tournament Results

USA Team Handball Nationals by year
Sports in Myrtle Beach, South Carolina